A Word for Nature is a 1798 comedy play by the British writer Richard Cumberland. It is also known by the alternative title of The Passive Husband.

The original Drury Lane cast included James Aickin as Lord Glenadry, Richard Suett as Sir Toby Truckle, William Barrymore as Clifton, John Bannister as Leonard, Robert Palmer as Starling, William Dowton as Runic and Jane Pope as Lady Truckle.

References

Bibliography
 Nicoll, Allardyce. A History of English Drama 1660–1900: Volume III. Cambridge University Press, 2009.
 Hogan, C.B (ed.) The London Stage, 1660–1800: Volume V. Southern Illinois University Press, 1968.

1798 plays
Comedy plays
West End plays
Plays by Richard Cumberland